Aurorobotys is a genus of moths of the family Crambidae.

Species
Aurorobotys aurorina (Butler, 1878)
Aurorobotys crassispinalis Munroe & Mutuura, 1971

References

Pyraustinae
Crambidae genera
Taxa named by Eugene G. Munroe